Norah Chambers (nee Margaret Constance Norah Hope; 1905–1989) was a Singaporean-born British chorale conductor and prisoner of war during World War II.

Biography
Chambers was born Margaret Constance Norah Hope to engineer James Laidlaw Hope and Margaret Annie Ogilvie Mitchell in 1905, Singapore. She was sent to boarding school in Aylesbury, England and went on to attend the Royal Academy of Music, London. Chambers studied piano, the violin, and chamber music. She went on to perform with the Royal Academy of Music orchestra under Sir Henry Wood.

Chambers married engineer John Lawrence Chambers in 1930 Malaya and they had a daughter Sally in 1933. She taught violin locally. After the Japanese invasion, Chambers traveled for five days through the jungle from Malaya to Singapore and succeeded in getting her daughter evacuated to Perth in Australia. She was also evacuated but the Vyner Brooke, her ship, was bombed and destroyed. She was interned in a Japanese prisoner of war camp, her husband sent to another. In 1943, she founded a vocal orchestra with Margaret Dryburgh, writing out the music from memory. Chambers was reunited with her family and returned to Malaya. She retired in 1952 to Jersey where she composed music for, and directed the St. Mark's Church choir in St. Helier. After the war the music produced in the camps was performed widely. Her work and time in the camp was the inspiration for the film Paradise Road.

Sources

1905 births
1989 deaths
Singaporean conductors (music)
British choral conductors
People from Singapore
Jersey musicians
British women in World War II
British women classical composers
British classical composers
British people in British Malaya